Świerkowo may refer to:

Świerkowo, Kuyavian-Pomeranian Voivodeship, a village in the administrative district of Gmina Choceń
Świerkowo, Masovian Voivodeship, a village in the administrative district of Gmina Świercze